Vasily Danilov may refer to:
Vasiliy Danilov (born 1941), Soviet/Russian footballer (soccer player)
Vasilii Danilov (born 1988), 2004 and 2008 Olympic swimmer from Kyrgyzstan

See also
Danilov (disambiguation)